Mark Abel (born April 28, 1948) is an American composer of classical music.

Background
After a brief stay at Stanford University in the late 1960s, Abel was active on the New York rock scene during the 1970s and early 1980s, leading his own groups, producing the bands The Feelies and The Bongos, and playing on albums of Tom Verlaine and former Left Banke mastermind Michael Brown. He returned to California in 1983 and worked in mainstream journalism for two decades, eventually becoming foreign editor of the San Francisco Chronicle. He moved away from rock during that period, immersed himself in classical and gradually began developing his hybridized style.

Career 
Eight CDs of Abel's music have appeared in the past dozen years. The self-released Journey Long, Journey Far  and Songs of Life, Love and Death attracted little notice. But The Dream Gallery, a 69-minute song cycle for seven soloists and chamber orchestra depicting the lives of imaginary archetypal Californians, caught the interest of pianist Carol Rosenberger, director of the Delos Productions label, leading to its recording by USC Thornton conductor Sharon Lavery and the La Brea Sinfonietta.

Delos’ release of Gallery in early 2012 began to bring Abel's music to a wider audience. The record garnered considerable acclaim, with notices ranging from “profound and compelling” and “not much like anything else out there, … most highly recommended” to “anyone who is interested in modern vocal music will want to own this disc.”

In the fall of 2013, Abel's “The Benediction” appeared on Stopping By, the debut CD of New York tenor Kyle Bielfield. The song explores Abel's feelings about the uneasy state of socially divided America.

Abel's second recording for Delos, Terrain of the Heart, a collection of art song cycles for voice and piano, was released in February 2014. It features three recitalists from the Los Angeles classical scene — sopranos Jamie Chamberlin and Ariel Pisturino, and pianist Victoria Kirsch.

The record was praised as "art song at a high-water mark of invention"  and for its "emotional directness and stylistic unpredictability." The Journal of Singing called "The Dark-Eyed Chameleon" cycle "captivating and important," adding that it "holds its own" with some of the most revered tragic cycles of Schubert, Schumann and Mahler.

In March 2016, Delos Productions released the double-CD package Home Is A Harbor — consisting of Abel's first opera (of the same name) and the song cycle "The Palm Trees are Restless", a setting of verses by Los Angeles poet Kate Gale. The cycle marked the beginning of a series of collaborations by Abel with Grammy-winning soprano Hila Plitmann.

Gramophone (magazine) commented “Abel employs a colorful blend of styles … (that) serve the emotional nature of each work to bracing and poignant effect. Abel’s lucid narrative and vibrant vocal lines, combined with telling orchestrations for a chamber ensemble, make (“Harbor”) an affecting experience. The brilliant soprano Hila Plitmann manages every leap and switch of emotional gears (in “Palm Trees”) with fearless commitment, and pianist Tali Tadmor matches her in power and subtlety.”

Richard Sininger of American Record Guide wrote that the recording showed Abel to be “at the forefront of (California's) musical life.”

Plitmann and Tadmor gave the world premiere of “The Palm Trees Are Restless” on Oct. 1, 2016, at the Boston Court Performing Arts Center in Pasadena, Ca. Plitmann has continued her support of Abel's music since then, premiering another Abel-Gale collaboration, the concert aria “Those Who Loved Medusa,” at a Dec. 10, 2017, concert at The Broad Stage in Santa Monica. Several months later, Plitmann was featured in a film dramatization of “Medusa” made by videographer Tempe Hale.

Plitmann recorded that piece and two other Abel works – “In the Rear View Mirror, Now” and “The Benediction” – for the composer's fourth Delos release, Time and Distance, which appeared in March 2018. The album also includes two pieces written for mezzo-soprano Janelle DeStefano  – the song cycle “The Ocean of Forgiveness,” a setting of poems by Joanne Regenhardt, and “The Invocation.” The “Ocean” cycle took the Honorable Mention in the 2018 Art Song Competition held by the National Association of Teachers of Singing.

Time and Distance was well received by music writers. Laurence Vittes of Gramophone praised Abel's “marriages of subtly charged music with an eclectic modernist twist to emotionally provocative, introspective texts.”  Gregory Berg of The Journal of Singing called Abel “a composer with bold and ambitious ideas and the resourcefulness to nearly always bring those ideas to full and effective fruition. His latest collection … marks a new level of excellence we have not seen before.” 

Theodore Bell of CultureSpot LA wrote: “The collection has a unique L.A. sound and attitude … .  Abel’s settings fuse chamber and contemporary styles seamlessly together to achieve a spacious feel with only a small ensemble.”  Huntley Dent of Fanfare observed: “Few current songwriters rival Abel’s intriguing texts and their reach into so many psychological and cultural issues. Meaning and melody go hand in hand in a very contemporary way, which I truly admire.” 

Enthused Joseph Newsome of Voix-des-Arts: “Too plentiful to enumerate are the passages in this music that are so wrenchingly private that they may compel the listener to ask, ‘How can this man whom I have never met know so much about my life?’ This intuition, uncanny and unifying, is the foundation of Abel's unique musical language and the quality that makes Time and Distance a disc that severs new veins of raw emotion each time that it is heard.” 

Abel shifted focus for his fifth Delos release, The Cave of Wondrous Voice, offering a program dominated by chamber music. Three American masters of the idiom – David Shifrin, Fred Sherry, and Carol Rosenberger – introduce Abel’s Clarinet Trio and “Intuition’s Dance,” while German violinist Sabrina-Vivian Höpcker and young American pianist Dominic Cheli perform “The Elastic Hours.” Hila Plitmann makes her fifth traversal of an Abel work in the song cycle “Four Poems of Marina Tsvetaeva,” accompanied by Rosenberger and English hornist Sarah Beck. The piece is the first setting of the Russian poet in English, with translations by Alyssa Dinega Gillespie.

Like its predecessors, Cave received wide acclaim. Beyond Criticism's Matthew Gurewitsch described the album as “sundown music, aglow with somber color and orientalist touches. Serendipity and an Impressionist sensibility … guide the ebb and flow. Beautiful.” Henry Schlinger of Culture Spot LA called the release “a wondrous creation” in which Abel “announced his arrival as a serious chamber music composer.” The Whole Note's Tiina Kiik wrote that Cave showed Abel to be “a compositional master of intriguing contemporary music.”

Gramophone's Donald Rosenberg praised Abel's “establishing of vibrant and urgent contexts for the interaction of voice and instruments,” and the Clarinet Trio's “poetic, engaging and philosophical material that these superb players afford colorful and lyrical delineation.” Fanfare's Huntley Dent declared: “Abel represents the best strain in contemporary American composers who can merge their musical gifts with a sensitive, far-reaching intellect. He brings up to date the strain of literary delving found in Schumann and Debussy.”

In fall 2021, Abel's duo composition Approaching Autumn appeared on a Delos album of the same name by San Francisco-based cellist Jonah Kim. The piece, performed with pianist Robert Koenig, was labeled “compelling” by Lou Fancher of San Francisco Classical Voice. Lynn René Bayley of The Art Music Lounge called it “a surprisingly dramatic piece … the work of an assured composer who knows what he is about. Not a single phrase or note is superfluous, repetitive, or just thrown in to impress the listener. … A work that I consider a modern American masterpiece.”

David W. Moore of the American Record Guide called Approaching Autumn "beautifully romantic" and Fanfare's Colin Clarke hailed it as “a splendid piece, nearly a quarter-hour of pure beauty.” Rafael de Acha of All About the Arts described it as “melodically forthcoming, harmoniously laid-out, often playful, eminently accessible, at times ruminative, unabashedly joyful at others. … A delightful work.” 

October 2022 saw the release of Spectrum, a 92-minute survey of Abel’s most recent work, evenly divided between vocal and chamber pieces. Soprano Isabel Bayrakdarian and mezzo Kindra Scharich make their first appearances on an Abel album, while Hila Plitmann returns for her sixth. Instrumental players include Carol Rosenberger, Dominic Cheli, David Samuel, Jonah Kim, Dennis Kim, Sean Kennard and Jeff Garza.

Awards
Global Music Awards - "Award of Excellence" for the lyrics in The Dream Gallery 
Global Music Awards - "Award of Merit" for "creativity/originality"

Discography
Spectrum (2022)
The Cave of Wondrous Voice (2020)
Time and Distance (2018)
Home Is A Harbor (2016)
Terrain of the Heart (2014)
The Dream Gallery (2012)
Journey Long, Journey Far (2008)
Songs of Life, Love and Death (2006)

References

External links

Meet Mark Abel - Delos
Global Music Awards
Richmond Confidential features The Dream Gallery
KCET - Mark Abel: A Contemporary Voice in Classical Music
The Right Human Blog
Opera Lively Interviews Composers Mark Abel
Second Inversion Podcast Interview

1948 births
American male classical composers
American classical composers
Living people
Musicians from Hartford, Connecticut
20th-century classical composers
21st-century American composers
21st-century classical composers
American male journalists
Journalists from Connecticut
San Francisco Chronicle people
20th-century American journalists
20th-century American composers
20th-century American male musicians
21st-century American male musicians